The 2013 Bank of Communications Shanghai Masters was a professional ranking snooker tournament that took place between 16 and 22 September 2013 at the Shanghai Grand Stage in Shanghai, China. It was the third ranking event of the 2013/2014 season.

John Higgins was the defending champion, but he lost 1–5 against Mark Davis in the last 16.

Ding Junhui won his seventh ranking title by defeating Xiao Guodong 10–6 in the final. This was the first time that two Chinese players had reached the final of a ranking event, but was also the first of three consecutive ranking finals between Asian players, all of which were won by Ding.

Prize fund
The total prize money of the event was raised to £425,000 from the previous year's £400,000. The breakdown of prize money for this year is shown below:

 Winner: £80,000
 Runner-up: £35,000
 Semi-final: £19,500
 Quarter-final: £11,000
 Last 16: £7,500
 Last 32: £6,000
 Last 48: £2,300
 Last 64: £1,500
 Last 96: £250

 Non-televised highest break: £200
 Televised highest break: £2,000
 Total: £425,000

Wildcard round
These matches were played in Shanghai on 16 and 17 September 2013.

Main draw

Final

Qualifying
These matches were held between 7 and 10 August 2013 at the Doncaster Dome in Doncaster, England.

Century breaks

Qualifying stage centuries

 137  Jamie Burnett
 128  Daniel Wells
 127  Peter Lines
 125  Gary Wilson
 120  Li Hang
 120  Cao Yupeng
 118  Simon Bedford
 115  John Astley
 113  Jack Lisowski

 108  Mike Dunn
 106  Mark Joyce
 105  Pankaj Advani
 105  Robbie Williams
 104  David Gilbert
 103  Tom Ford
 100  Matthew Selt
 100  Jamie Jones
 100  Joe Perry

Televised stage centuries

 140, 107  Barry Hawkins
 133  Kyren Wilson
 129, 126, 109, 106  Ding Junhui
 127, 122, 111  Xiao Guodong
 127, 109  Martin Gould
 122, 104  Neil Robertson
 122, 102  Mark Davis

 120, 107, 101  Mark Selby
 116, 102  Shaun Murphy
 115, 113  Michael Holt
 109  Fang Xiongman
 107, 100  John Higgins
 106  Mark King

References

External links
 2013 Bank of Communications Shanghai Masters – Pictures by Tai Chengzhe and Wang Chun at Facebook

2013
Shanghai Masters
Shanghai Masters (snooker)